William Leonard Metherell (17 November 1908 – 30 October 1992) was an Australian rules footballer who played with Geelong in the VFL during the 1930s.

Metherell started his career in 1927 at Western Australian club Subiaco and topped their goalkicking with 49 goals. He went on to play 45 games for the club before transferring to Geelong. 

In his debut season for Geelong he played in a losing Grand Final and in the following year, 1931, he was a member of Geelong's premiership side. Mostly a support ruckman, Metherell also rested a lot in defence and was joined by his younger brother Jack in 1932. He liked to crash through packs and was a regular exponent of the drop punt. Metherell polled well in the 1935 Brownlow Medal, finishing equal ninth.

He was coach of Geelong in the 1941 VFL season but could manage only three wins.

Len was also an outstanding cricketer. He made 24 centuries between 1930-41 compiling 5465 runs at 66.6 in the Geelong Cricket Association. He was named in the G.C.A. Team Of The Century.

References

External links

Len Metherell's playing statistics from WAFL Footy Facts
Len Metherell's coaching statistics from AFL Tables

1908 births
1992 deaths
Australian rules footballers from Western Australia
Geelong Football Club players
Geelong Football Club Premiership players
Geelong Football Club coaches
Subiaco Football Club players
One-time VFL/AFL Premiership players
People from Boulder, Western Australia